Mayada Al-Sayad (born 26 October 1992 in Berlin) is a German-born Palestinian long-distance runner. She competed in the marathon at the 2015 World Championships and at the 2016 Olympics, where she finished 50th and was the Palestinian flag bearer in the opening ceremony. In 2017 she participated in the World Championships held in London, placing 68th in the Marathon, with a time of 2:54:58, her season's best.

Al-Sayad was born to a Palestinian father and a German mother, and has dual citizenship. She works as an assistant to her father, who is a dental technician.

See also
 Palestine at the 2015 World Championships in Athletics
 Palestine at the 2016 Summer Olympics

References

Living people
Athletes from Berlin
1992 births
German people of Palestinian descent
Palestinian female long-distance runners
Palestinian female marathon runners
German female marathon runners
Olympic athletes of Palestine
Athletes (track and field) at the 2016 Summer Olympics
World Athletics Championships athletes for Palestine